The Maratha clan system (also referred to as Shahannava Kuli Marathas, 96 Kuli Marathas or 96K), refers to the network of 96 clans of families and essentially their surnames, within the Maratha caste of India. The Marathas primarily reside in the Indian state of Maharashtra, with smaller regional populations in other states.

In Maratha society, membership of a Kul or clan is acquired in a patrilineal manner. People belonging to a clan usually have a common surname, a common clan deity, and a common clan totem (Devak).
 Various lists have been compiled, purporting to list the 96 "true Maratha" clans, but these lists vary greatly and are disputed. The list of ninety-six clans is divided into five ranked tiers, the highest of which contains the five primary Maratha clans.

Within a clan, ranking also depends on whether a man is progeny of proper marriage or a product of hypergamy. High ranking Maratha clans also historically  held rights to hereditary estate or Watan.This included land grants, tax collection rights (revenue Patilki or policing (Police Patilki) of a village. Higher ranking clans held rights to larger estates or Jagirs. Clans with watan usually hold written genealogical records stretching back several generations.

Prominent modern Indian and western historians and anthropologists state that the 96 kul(clans) and genealogies were fabricated after the Maratha gained political prominence. Maratha caste was formed after the families from various peasant subgroups in Maharashtra separated from their original caste and amalgamated into the Maratha caste. These families employed genealogists to fabricate the clans. These clans were flexible enough that most of the Kunbi population got absorbed into these clans even in the 20th century. Thus, these clans have no ritual foundation.

See also
List of Maratha dynasties and states
Maratha caste origin

Notes